Li Shiming is a Chinese general.

Li Shiming may also refer to:

Li Shiming (politician) (born 1955), vice-president of the All-China Federation of Trade Unions

See also
Li Shimin (599–649), Emperor Taizong of Tang Dynasty